The Centre Henry-Leonard is a 3,042 capacity (2,779 seated) multi-purpose arena in Baie-Comeau, Quebec, Canada. It is home to the Baie-Comeau Drakkar ice hockey team of the Quebec Major Junior Hockey League. It was built in 1970.

Baie-Comeau
Indoor arenas in Quebec
Indoor ice hockey venues in Quebec
Quebec Major Junior Hockey League arenas
Sports venues in Quebec
Buildings and structures in Côte-Nord